Alessia Berra (born 17 January 1994) is an Italian Paralympic swimmer. She claimed the silver medal in the women's butterfly S13 event at the 2020 Summer Paralympics.

Life 
She studied at University of Milan. She initially took part in able bodied swimming competitions before switching to Para swimming in 2015.

Career 
She competed at the 2015 IPC Swimming World Championships. 

She made her Paralympic debut representing Italy at the 2016 Summer Paralympics.

References

External links
 

1994 births
Living people
Paralympic swimmers of Italy
Paralympic silver medalists for Italy
Italian female butterfly swimmers
Sportspeople from Monza
Swimmers at the 2016 Summer Paralympics
Swimmers at the 2020 Summer Paralympics
Medalists at the 2020 Summer Paralympics
Paralympic medalists in swimming
S13-classified Paralympic swimmers